Nádúr (Irish for "nature") is a studio album by Irish folk group Clannad, and was released digitally worldwide on 20 September 2013 and physically within the following week or two, depending on the country. It was the first new studio album since Landmarks in 1997, and the first to feature all five original members of Clannad since the compilation album Past Present in 1989.
It is also the last to feature Pádraig Duggan who died on 9 August 2016.

Track listing

Singles

Vellum (1-track promo) 2013
Brave Enough (1-track promo) 2013

References

External links

2013 albums
Clannad albums
Grammy Award for Best New Age Album
RCA Records albums